Bangur is a census town in Kendujhar district  in the state of Odisha, India.

Demographics
 India census, Bangur had a population of 5168. Males constitute 52% of the population and females 48%. Bangur has an average literacy rate of 57%, lower than the national average of 59.5%; with 62% of the males and 38% of females literate. 14% of the population is under 6 years of age.

References

Cities and towns in Kendujhar district